Theodore E. Margeson (born in New Glasgow, Nova Scotia, Canada),is a judge currently serving on the Tax Court of Canada.

References

Living people
Schulich School of Law alumni
Judges of the Federal Court of Canada
People from New Glasgow, Nova Scotia
Year of birth missing (living people)